This is a list of election results for the electoral district of Barossa in South Australian elections.

Members for Barossa

Election results

Elections in the 1960s

Elections in the 1950s

References

South Australian state electoral results by district